Edward Holmes Martin (September 30, 1931 – December 23, 2014) was a vice admiral in the United States Navy. Martin attended the United States Naval Academy, graduating in the class of 1954. He was also an alumnus of George Washington University, the Naval War College, and the National War College. During the Vietnam War, Martin was shot down during a mission and was kept as a prisoner of war in Hanoi for close to six years.

Martin was a former Chief of Naval Air Training and Commander of Carrier Group FOUR, Carrier Group TWO, Task Force SIXTY, and of the United States Sixth Fleet. He also served as Deputy Chief of Naval Operations for Air Warfare. After his stint as Deputy CNO, he was appointed as United States Commander, Eastern Atlantic and the Deputy Commander-in-Chief, U.S. Naval Forces Europe. He retired in 1989. In retirement he worked in Europe for Xerox Corporation, and in California as a private investor. He was married with three children.

Background
Martin was born in Savannah, Georgia on September 30, 1931. He attended public school and Armstrong College as
well as the University of Georgia Off-Campus Division. In 1950 he entered the U.S. Naval Academy from where he graduated in 1954. Following his graduation from Annapolis, Martin entered flight training in Pensacola, Florida and later in Kingsville, Texas. From the fall of 1955 until 1959 he served in various carrier based squadrons operating out of San Diego, California. From 1959 until 1962, Martin was an instructor in the light jet Attack Replacement Squadron. In July 1964 he attended the U.S. Naval War College in Newport, Rhode Island. He also holds a master's degree in International Affairs. In July 1965, he reported to Attack Squadron Thirty-Four in Jacksonville, Florida where he served as Operations Officer and Executive Officer.

Prisoner of war
On July 9, 1967, Martin was leading a flight of A4 Skyhawks from the carrier Intrepid, when he encountered numerous surface-to-air missiles near southeast Hanoi. His aircraft was hit and burst into flames. After ejecting safely from the plane, Martin was captured upon landing. During his captivity, both of Martin's shoulders were broken during rope torture and he was confined in both leg and wrist irons. He spent a lot of time in solitary confinement and was subjected to beatings. For the next five years and eight months Martin was held captive in the Hanoi area, until his release on March 4, 1973. Martin died at the age of 83 on December 23, 2014 at a hospital in San Diego, California of a head injury sustained in a fall at his home.

Decorations and medals

References

External links
Dictionary Of American Naval Aviation Squadrons—Volume I

United States Navy admirals
1931 births
2014 deaths
People from Savannah, Georgia
Military personnel from Georgia (U.S. state)
United States Naval Academy alumni
Naval War College alumni
Recipients of the Navy Distinguished Service Medal
Recipients of the Legion of Merit